Events from the year 1591 in France

Incumbents
 Monarch – Henry IV

Events
Siege of Rouen

Births
 
15 March – Alexandre de Rhodes, Jesuit missionary (died 1660)

Full date missing
Girard Desargues, mathematician (died 1661)

Deaths

Full date missing
Barnabé Brisson, jurist and politician (born 1531)
Noël du Fail, jurist and writer (born c.1520)
Edmond Auger, Jesuit (born 1530)
Claude de Sainctes, Catholic controversialist (born 1525)

See also

References

1590s in France